Wodziński (feminine: Wodzińska; plural: Wodzińscy) is a Polish surname. Notable people with the surname include:

 Cezary Wodziński (1959–2016), Polish philosopher
 Marcin Wodziński (born 1966), Polish historian
 Maria Wodzińska (1819–1896), Polish artist

See also
 

Polish-language surnames